Sula Island is an island located in the Albay province of the Philippines.

See also

 List of islands of the Philippines

References

Further reading
 

Islands of Albay